Squidbillies is an American animated television series created by Jim Fortier and Dave Willis for Cartoon Network's late night programming block, Adult Swim. An unofficial pilot for the series aired on April 1, 2005. The series later made its official debut on October 16, 2005 and ended on December 13, 2021, with a total of 132 episodes over the course of 13 seasons.

The series is about the Cuyler family, an impoverished family of anthropomorphic hillbilly mud squids living in the Georgia region of the Blue Ridge Mountains. The series revolves around the exploits of an alcoholic father (Early), who is often abusive in a comedic way towards his family. His son, Rusty, is desperate for his approval; his mother and grandmother, known in the show as Granny, is often the center of his aggression; and Lil, Early's sister, is mostly unconscious in a pool of her own vomit.

The series also airs in syndication in other countries and has been released on various DVD sets and other forms of home media.

Setting and premise
Squidbillies follows the exploits of the Cuyler family and their interactions with the local populace, which usually results in a fair amount of destruction, mutilation, and death. The Cuylers are essentially given free rein and protected from the consequences of their actions whenever possible by their crudely-drawn friend, the Sheriff (whose name is "Sharif"), as they are said to be the last twisted remnants of a federally protected endangered species, the "Appalachian Mud Squid". They live in the southern Appalachian Mountains located in the North Georgia mountains. At the epicentre of this rural paradise is Dougal County, home to crippling gambling addictions, a murderous corporation, sexual deviants, and the authentic Southern mountain squid. In the words of The New York Times, the show takes "backwoods stereotypes" and turns them into "a cudgel with which to pound maniacally on all manner of topical subjects."

Production
Squidbillies is produced by Williams Street Productions; it is written by Dave Willis, co-creator of Aqua Teen Hunger Force, and Jim Fortier, previously of The Brak Show, both of whom worked on the Adult Swim series Space Ghost Coast to Coast. The show is animated by Awesome Inc, with background design by Ben Prisk.

Voice cast
Stuart Daniel Baker (2005–2019) and Tracy Morgan (2021) as Early Cuyler
Daniel McDevitt as Rusty Cuyler
Dana Snyder as Granny
Patricia French as Aunt Lil
Charles Napier (2005–2006) and Bobby Ellerbee (2006–2021) as Sheriff
Todd Hanson as Dan Halen
Scott Hilley (2005–2014) as Reverend
Elizabeth Cook (2011–2021) and Faye Otto (2015) as Tammi
Jason Isbell as Reverend Nubbins
Dave Willis as Deputy Denny and Glenn

Dismissal of Stuart Baker 
On August 16, 2020, it was announced that Baker was fired from the series for his controversial comments towards the Black Lives Matter movement and country singer Dolly Parton. A response was posted on Facebook by Baker claiming that being fired from Squidbillies ruined his life. The response was later deleted.

The thirteenth and final season of Squidbillies premiered on November 7, 2021, with Baker being replaced by comedian Tracy Morgan.

Episodes

International broadcast 
In Canada, Squidbillies previously aired on Teletoon's Teletoon at Night block and later G4's Adult Digital Distraction block. The series currently airs on the Canadian version of Adult Swim.

Guest appearances 
 Jackyl performed "Raised By Jackyl" in "America: Why I Love Her" (Season 5, Episode 10)
 .38 Special voiced themselves, and their song "Caught Up in You" is featured in "Burned and Reburned Again" (Season 2, Episode 10)
 Tim "Action Plan" Andrews voiced the homicidal GPS in "Fatal Distraction" (Season 5, Episode 7)
 Jason "Wee Man" Acuña voiced himself in "The Guzzle Bumpkin" (Season 11, Episode 2)
 Fred Armisen voiced Miguel in "Take This Job and Love It" (Season 1, Episode 2) and Office Politics Trouble" (Season 1, Episode 6), Jesus in "Giant Foam Dickhat Trouble" (Season 2, Episode 5) and Hippie Killed With Chainsaw in "Earth Worst" (Season 3, Episode 6).
 Todd Barry voiced Glenn in "Office Politics Trouble" (Season 1, Episode 6) and Dr. Bug in "Family Trouble" (Season 1, Episode 5).
 Vernon Chatman (as Clarence Towelstein) voiced Shuckey the Corn Mascot in "Mud Days and Cornfused" (Season 3, Episode 18)
 David Allan Coe is uncredited for voicing himself in "Okaleechee Dam Jam" (Season 3, Episode 17)
 Elizabeth Cook performed the theme song and voiced Tammi in "Keeping It In The Family Way" (Season 6).
 Coolio voiced himself in "The Guzzle Bumpkin" (Season 11, Episode 2)
 Bradford Cox voiced himself in "Granite Caverns" (Season 8, Episode 1)
 Lavell Crawford voiced Judge Jammer in "Stop. Jammertime!" (Season 8, Episode 6)
 Rachel Dratch voiced a Hippie Woman in "Earth Worst" (Season 3, Episode 6)
 Drive-By Truckers performed in "America: Why I Love Her" (Season 5, Episode 10)
 Eric "Butterbean" Esch voiced himself and sang the national anthem in "Condition: Demolition" (Season 3, Episode 9)
 Mick Foley is uncredited for voicing Thunder Clap in "Anabolic-holic" (Season 4, Episode 4)
 Kevin Gillespie voiced himself in "Asbestos I Can" (Season 6, Episode 1)
 Tony Guerrero voiced a prisoner in "Dove in an Iron Cage" (Season 11, Episode 1)
 Phil Hendrie guest-starred in "Lean Green Touchdown Makifying Machine" (Season 5, Episode 9)
 Jason Isbell performed the theme song in "The Pharaoh's Wad" (Season 6, Episode 8) and voiced the new reverend Kyle Nubbins in "Greener Pastor" (Season 10, Episode 7), later going on to be his official V.A.
 David Jackson voiced a Japanese war veteran  and a documentary narrator in "The Appalachian Mud Squid: Darwin's Dilemma" (Season 3, Episode 10)
 Jonathan Katz is uncredited for voicing The Rapist in "Government Brain Voodoo Trouble" (Season 2, Episode 1).
 George Lowe voiced Space Ghost in "Unofficial Pilot" (Season 1, fake pilot) and a TV wrestling-promo voice in "Anabolic-holic" (season 4, episode 4)
 Riley Martin voiced the Horseman of Pestilence in "Armageddon It On!" (Season 3, Episode 13) and a voice inside Dan Halen's head in "Pile M For Murder" (Season 3, Episode 19)
 Ralphie May (as Sweet Dick May) voiced PNUT in "Thou Shale Not Drill" (Season 8, Episode 7). This was the second 30-minute episode in the series' history.
 JD McPherson voiced a prisoner in "Dove in an Iron Cage" (Season 11, Episode 1)
 The Mighty Ohba provided the Japanese voice dub of Early Cuyler in "Snow Daddy" (Season 6, Episode 6)
 Rhett Miller performed as an al-Qaeda representative with a hook hand in "America: Why I Love Her" (Season 5, Episode 10)
 Dan Mirvish (as Danny Torrance) voiced himself in "The Guzzle Bumpkin" (Season 11, Episode 2)
 Andrew Montesi announced the Festival of the Clowny Freak commercial in "Clowny Freaks" (Season 5, Episode 8)
 Casey Motter announced the baseball game in "Debased Ball" (Season 11, Episode 6)
 Larry Munson provided the Voice of God on "Armageddon It On!" (Season 3, Episode 13)
 Tim Andrews Provided the Larry Munson voice after Munson's death. 
 Amber Nash voiced Prosperity in "Lipstick on a Squid" (Season 10, Episode 1)
 Chad Ochocinco voiced himself in "Lean Green Touchdown Makifying Machine" (Season 5, Episode 9)
 Tara Ochs guest-starred in "Lipstick on a Squid" (Season 10, Episode 1)
 Patton Oswalt (as Shecky Chucklestein) voiced the One-Eyed Giant Squid in "Survival of The Dumbest" (Season 2, Episode 12)
 Paleface voiced a guy at a bar in "Green and Sober" (Season 7, Episode 4)
 Grey Revell voiced a musician in "Green and Sober" (Season 7, Episode 4)
 Stan Robak voiced Pompidov in "Confessions of a Grangrenous Mind" (Season 4, Episode 5)
 George Robinson voiced Snow Daddy in "Snow Daddy" (Season 6, Episode 6)
 Ryuu-chan provided the Japanese voice dub of Rusty Cuyler in "Snow Daddy" (Season 6, Episode 6)
 Mike Schatz voiced the Prosecutor in "Terminous Trouble" (Season 2) and the Scientist in "God's Bro" (Season 4).
 Billy Joe Shaver performed the theme song in several episodes and voiced a customs agent and a TV announcer in "Trucked Up!" (Season 6, Episode 10)
 Brendon Small wrote and played the "Rusty Shreds" metal pieces in "Mephistopheles Traveled Below to a Southern State Whose Motto Is 'Wisdom, Justice and Moderation'" (Season 3, Episode 5). He also voiced Dr. Jerry in "Family Trouble" but was listed in the credits as "Donald Cock".
 Todd Snider performed the main title in "Fatal Distraction" (Season 5, Episode 7) and as a rabbit in "America: Why I Love Her" (Season 5, Episode 10) and voiced a lobster in "Clowny Freaks" (Season 5, Episode 8)
 Soilent Green performed the main title theme on "Lerm" (Season 4, Episode 1)
 Split Lip Rayfield was credited in writing Rusty's bluegrass Hell Jams in "Mephistopheles Traveled Below to a Southern State Whose Motto Is 'Wisdom, Justice and Moderation'" (Season 3, Episode 5)
 Paul Stanley voiced himself in "Fatal Distraction" (Season 5, Episode 6)
 Jared Swilley voiced himself in "Granite Caverns" (Season 8, Episode 1)
 T-Pain voiced himself in "Asbestos I Can" (Season 6, Episode 1) and performed the theme song in "Trucked Up!" (Season 6, Episode 10).
 Larry Wachs voiced a clown in "Clowny Freaks" (Season 5, Episode 8)
 Gillian Welch, David Rawlings, Lucinda Williams, Will Oldham, Jimmie Dale Gilmore, and Hayes Carll performed as various singing forest animals in "America: Why I Love Her" (Season 5, Episode 10). This was the first 30-minute episode in the series' history.
 Justin "Fireball" Whitaker  is uncredited for voicing "Earth Worst" ( Season 3, Episode 6 )
 Jesco White voiced Ga-Ga-Pee-Pap Cuyler in "Dead Squid Walking" (Season 5, Episode 3)
 Mamie White voiced Krystal's cousin in "The Many Loves of Early Cuyler" (Season 5, Episode 2)
 Widespread Panic performed the main title theme and voiced themselves in "Need for Weed" (Season 5, Episode 1)
 Jon Wurster (as Roy Ziegler) voiced Dakota the Hippie in "Earth Worst" (Season 3, Episode 6) and Skyler The Blue Blood Sucking monster in "The Tiniest Princess" (Season 2, Episode 12).

Artists who performed versions of the theme song 

 Against Me!
 Alabama Shakes
 The B-52's
 The Baseball Project
 Black Lips
 Blackberry Smoke
 The Both
 Camper Van Beethoven
 Cannibal Corpse
 Clutch
 Hayes Carll
 Neko Case
 Centro-Matic
 Jimmy Cliff
 Elizabeth Cook
 Steve Earle
 Jimmie Dale Gilmore
 Jan Hammer
 Unknown Hinson
 In Search of Sight
 Jackyl
 Jason Isbell and the 400 Unit
 The Jayhawks
 George Jones
 King Khan and the Shrines
 Matthew Kaminsky, organist for the Atlanta Braves
 Lambchop
 Chuck Leavell & Francine Reed
 Let's Active
 Lera Lynn featuring Joshua Grange
 Lynyrd Skynyrd
 Max Q
 The Milk Carton Kids
 Father John Misty
 Bob Mould
 John Prine
 Pueblo Cafe
 Todd Rundgren
 Rebecca Schiffman
 Ty Segall
 Sturgill Simpson
 William Shatner
 Billy Joe Shaver
 Shovels & Rope
 Todd Snider
 Soilent Green
 T-Pain
 Trampled by Turtles
 Sharon Van Etten
 Kurt Vile
 Gillian Welch & David Rawlings
 Western Crooners
 Widespread Panic
 Lucinda Williams
 "Weird Al" Yankovic
 Yelawolf
 Dwight Yoakam
 ZZ Top

Merchandise

Soundtrack 
In January 2012, a free 35-track soundtrack was released on the Adult Swim music site entitled The Squidbillies Present: Music for Americans Only Made by Americans in China for Americans Only God Bless America, U.S.A.

Another album, entitled Squidbillies Double Platinum Gold, was released on vinyl in July 2019.

Home releases 

The series is also available on HBO Max since September 1, 2020.

See also 

 List of Squidbillies episodes
 Pacific Northwest tree octopus

References

External links 

 
 
 
 Article at Gelf Magazine

2005 American television series debuts
2021 American television series endings
2000s American adult animated television series
2000s American animated comedy television series
2000s American black comedy television series
2000s American satirical television series
2000s American surreal comedy television series
2010s American adult animated television series
2010s American animated comedy television series
2010s American black comedy television series
2010s American satirical television series
2010s American surreal comedy television series
2020s American adult animated television series
2020s American animated comedy television series
2020s American black comedy television series
2020s American satirical television series
2020s American surreal comedy television series
American adult animated comedy television series
American flash adult animated television series
English-language television shows
Adult Swim original programming
Television series created by Jim Fortier
Television series created by Dave Willis
Television shows set in Georgia (U.S. state)
Animated television series about dysfunctional families
Television series by Williams Street